The Italy women's national handball team represent Italy in international team handball competitions.

It participated in the 2001 World Women's Handball Championship, which was hosted in Italy, placing 16th. It won the EHF Challenge Trophy in 2004.

Competitive record

World Championship
2001 – 16th

Mediterranean Games 

 1979 - 3rd
 1987 - Winner
 1991 – 4th
 1993 – 5th
 1997 – 7th
 2001 – 6th
 2005 – 6th
 2009 – 8th
 2013 – 8th
 2018 – 6th

Current squad
Squad for the qualification phase to the 2023 World Women's Handball Championship.

See also
Italy women's national beach handball team
Italy men's national handball team

References

External links
Official website
IHF profile

Handball
Women's national handball teams
National team